King Cassie Kabwita (born Sharon Kasweka Kabwita on 13 October 1988), popularly known as King Cassie, is a Zambian actor and film-maker. She is also known for he appearance in the Zambian TV series Loves Games as Kanswa Chileshe, and for her role in the 2015 film Sink or Swim: The Perilous Journey. Kabwita is also the chief executive officer of her own production company King Cassie Empire and is the current African Film Festival Ambassador. She is the first Zambian actor to feature in a Nollywood film and collaborate with Nigerians, Ghanaians, Tanzanians and Kenyans. She is one of the pioneers of the film era in Zambian cinema.

Early life and education
Kabwita was born in Kabwe on 13 October 1988.  She began acting, creative writing and poetry at the age of 7. In June 2009 she moved to Dar-Essalaam, Tanzania, where she started acting as a hobby.

Kabwita attended Buteko Basic School and was the head girl at Luanshya Girls High School. She studied hospitality business at Speciss College.

In October 2009 she played minor roles in two movies, Roho Sita and Sweet Revenge.  In 2010 she was cast in the movie Familia Yangu, where she plays two roles, one as a mother to two children and the second as an old lady looking for a job as a maid. She then joined the Zambia film industry in 2012 under the Zambian TV series Love Games.

Career
Kabwita is one of the pioneers of the Zambian film industry, becoming the most celebrated actress in Zambia. She entered the entertainment world in 2009. In 2013 she produced her first movie in Zambia and Tanzania, Guilt; she also played the lead role.

In 2015 the Mwape Peer Awards in New York, United States honored her with the best uprising star award based on her contribution to Zambian cinema, making her the first actress to receive the award.

In 2017, she produced her second film, the sexual and gender based violence awareness movie Kwacha, which featured Tanzanian and Zambian actors.

Filmography

Director / writer / producer

Actress

Awards and nominations

References 

1988 births
Living people
Zambian film directors
Zambian women film directors
Zambian film producers
Zambian women film producers
Zambian television people
People from Ndola
People from Dar es Salaam
Zambian actresses